Metaphalangium is a genus of harvestmen in the family Phalangiidae.

Species
 Metaphalangium abruptus (Kollar, in Roewer 1911)
 Metaphalangium abstrusus (L.Koch, 1882)
 Metaphalangium albiunilineatum (Lucas, 1847)
 Metaphalangium bispinifrons (Roewer, 1911)
 Metaphalangium cirtanum (C.L.Koch, 1839)
 Metaphalangium leiobuniformis (C.L.Koch, 1872)
 Metaphalangium monticola (Mkheidze, 1952)
 Metaphalangium orientale Starega, 1973
 Metaphalangium punctatus Roewer, 1956
 Metaphalangium spiniferum (Lucas, 1840)
 Metaphalangium spinipes Roewer, 1956
 Metaphalangium strandi (Nosek, 1905)
 Metaphalangium sudanum Roewer, 1961
 Metaphalangium tuberculatum (Lucas, 1847)

References

Harvestmen
Harvestman genera